Miomoptera is an extinct order of insects. Although it is thought to be a common ancestor of all holometabolous insects, because no smooth transition between Miomoptera and other holometabolous insect orders is known, it is considered to be in a separate order unto itself.

The Miomopterans were small insects, with unspecialised chewing mandibles and short abdominal cerci. They had four wings of equal size, with a relatively simple venation, similar to that of the more primitive living holometabolous insects, such as lacewings.

Adult morphology suggests the adults lived in open habitats. The morphology and gut content shows they fed on the pollen and strobili of gymnosperms. Based on the morphology of the ovipositor, larvae also fed on the pollen of strobili, moving between the scales from one microsporangium to another.

Families and genera 
Metropatoridae
Metropator
Archaemiopteridae
Archaemioptera
Eodelopterum
Saaromioptera
Tychtodelopterum
Palaeomanteidae
Palaeomantis
Delopterum
Miomatoneura
Miomatoneurella
Permodelopterum
Perunopterum
Permosialidae Martynov, 1928
Epimastax Martynov, 1928Permonka Riek, 1973Sarbalopterodes Storozhenko, 1991Permosialis Martynov, 1928
Reference:Tree of Life Web Project. 2003. Miomoptera. in The Tree of Life Web Project,

References

 Rasnitsyn, A.P. & Dijk, D.E., van. 2011. The first Gondwanan Epimastax from the Lopingian of KwaZulu-Natal, South Africa (Insecta: Palaeomanteida = Miomoptera: Permosialidae). African Invertebrates'' 52 (1): 207–209.

Extinct insect orders
Carboniferous first appearances
Middle Jurassic extinctions
Endopterygota